Why Women Have Better Sex Under Socialism is a 2018 book by anthropologist Kristen Ghodsee. 

In the book, Ghodsee argues that socialism creates a fairer and better society for women. She uses case studies drawn from Eastern Europe to illustrate that capitalism creates an increased dependency on men, by women.

Publication 
Why Women Have Better Sex Under Socialism: And Other Arguments for Economic Independence is a 2018 book by anthropologist Kristen Ghodsee, and published by Vintage Books. Ghodsee is a professor of Russian and East European Studies at the University of Pennsylvania. The book has also been translated into multiple foreign languages, including Spanish, French, German, Portuguese, Dutch, Russian, Polish, Czech, Slovak, Indonesian, Thai, Korean, and Japanese.

Synopsis 
In the book, Ghodsee argues that socialist societies are better for women. She presents the reader with a view of motherhood from an economic and political perspective. She is critical of the sexualised images that frequently appear in western magazines and television, which she describes as capitalism commodifying women. She presents a series of case studies from Eastern Europe and illustrates that compared to capitalist societies, women are more liberated and have more control of their lives in socialist societies. She points out how women tend to earn less than men in capitalist societies, thus making women more dependant on men, and receiving more pressure to get married.

Two chapters of the book are about sexual economics, and are critical of puritanical tendencies in western societies while praising the normalisation of sex in socialist societies. The book quotes studies showing greater sexual satisfaction among women in East Germany compared to those in West Germany.

Ghodsee advocates for a Universal Basic Income which she argues would balance inequity resulting from unpaid labour that women undertake.

Critical reception 
Rebecca Mead, writing in The New Yorker describes the book as smart and accessible. Suzanne Moore writing in The Guardian called it a "joyous read."

Amber Edwards writing in Philosophy Now described the book as enjoyable, short, and snappy and credits Ghodsee for her nuance, and recognition of the flaws in every example she presents. Edwards also lamented the lack of intersectionality in the book.

See also 
 Do Communists Have Better Sex?, a 2006 German documentary
 Socialist feminism

References

External links 
 Official website
 2017 New York Times opinion piece by Kristen Ghodsee: Why Women Had Better Sex Under Socialism
 2021 interview with the author on France24

2018 non-fiction books
Works about sex
Works about sexism
Works about sexual repression
Books about socialism
Vintage Books books